Shenyang University of Technology (SUT) is a university in Shenyang, Liaoning, China under the provincial government.

History

Schools and departments
SUT is an engineering-oriented comprehensive university, with its subjects covering engineering, science, economy, management, liberal arts and laws. Mechanical engineering, electronics, electric power, chemical engineering, architecture and information science and technology have constituted the bulk of the engineering area. At present it has a School of Mechanical Engineering, School of Material Science and Engineering, School of Electrical Engineering, School of Information Science and Engineering, School of Economics, School of Administration, Science School, School of Literature and Law, Petrochemical Engineering School, School of Architecture and Civil Engineering, School of Foreign Languages, Lifelong Education School, School of International Education, Xinghua School, Senior Vocational Technology School, Postgraduate School, School of Software, Physical Education Section, Engineering Practice Center and other supplementary sections.

There are 35 undergraduate programs offered at SUT, 21 of which lead to master's degree. It is authorized for the conferment of Scholar degree, master's degree and doctoral degree. SUT's nationally accredited doctoral programs include Electrical Machinery & Electrical Apparatus and Material Processing Engineering. The A level subject of Electrical Engineering has its own post doctoral research center. Electrical Machinery and Electrical Apparatus has obtained the status of state-level key subject. SUT has obtained the authorities for the recruitment of students for master's degrees of engineering, special testing for on-the-job students for master's degrees, the conferment of master's degree for the on-the-job students, and the recruitment of international students including students from Hong Kong, Macao and Taiwan.

Campus 
The campus consists of two parts: the core campus, the original Shenyang Mechanical and Electrical Engineering College (adjacent to Shenyang Economy and Technology Developing Zone) and the division Liaoyang campus (the previous Liaoyang Petrochemical College, adjacent to the petrochemical base).

Universities and colleges in Shenyang
Engineering universities and colleges in China
Technical universities and colleges in China
1949 establishments in China
Educational institutions established in 1949